Roman Anthony Semproch (born January 7, 1931), also known as Baby and Ray, is a retired right-handed Major League Baseball pitcher who played from 1958 to 1961 for the Philadelphia Phillies, Detroit Tigers and Los Angeles Angels.

He was signed by the Phillies as an amateur free agent in 1951, but he did not make his big league debut until many years later – on April 15, 1958, against the Cincinnati Reds. The year prior, he'd gone 12–4 with a 2.64 ERA for the Triple-A Miami Marlins. In his first major league game, he gave up a hit and a walk, struck out two, and earned the win in a three inning relief appearance. Overall, he went 13–11 with a 3.92 ERA in 36 big league games (30 starts) that season. Although he was leading the league in wins at mid-season, his success tapered off and he finished with a winning percentage slightly higher than .500.

Asthmatic, Semproch never lived up to his rookie season's success. In 1959, he went only 3–10 with a 5.40 ERA in 30 games (18 starts). He was traded to the Tigers on December 5, 1959 with Chico Fernandez for Ken Walters, Ted Lepcio, and minor leaguer Alex Cosmidis. In 17 relief appearances for the Tigers in 1960, he had an ERA of 4.00 and a record of 3–0. Despite that moderate success, he was traded on June 15, 1960 to the Los Angeles Dodgers with cash for Clem Labine. He would never play in a Dodgers uniform.

On November 28, 1960, he was drafted by the Washington Senators in the Rule 5 draft (he and John Gabler were the first two player acquired by the "new" Washington Senators of 1961). On April 7, 1961, the Angels purchased him from the Senators. He'd appear in only two games for the Angels, posting a 9.00 ERA. He played his final major league game on May 2, 1961.

Overall, Semproch went 19–21 with a 4.42 ERA in 85 games (48 starts). In 344 innings, he walked 136 batters and struck out 156. He hit .116 at the plate and had a .965 fielding percentage.

Following his big league career, he worked as a bar manager at his brother's Italian restaurant.

References

External links

1930 births
Living people
Baseball players from Cleveland
Detroit Tigers players
Elizabethton Phils players
Los Angeles Angels players
Major League Baseball pitchers
Miami Marlins (IL) players
Philadelphia Phillies players
Reidsville Phillies players
Spokane Indians players
Terre Haute Phillies players
Toronto Maple Leafs (International League) players
Trois-Rivières Phillies players
Wilson Tobs players